Clara GAA is a Gaelic Athletic Association club situated in the small parish of Clara in County Kilkenny, Ireland. Focused mainly on hurling and camogie, the dominant sports in the county, Clara's greatest achievements to date are victories in the Kilkenny Senior Hurling Championship in 1986 2013, and in 2015 they secured their third title.

Despite limited success at county level, Clara has produced several hurlers who have gone on play at inter-county level for Kilkenny. Jim Langton was born in the area, a winner of All-Ireland medals in 1939 and 1947, and a place on the GAA Hurling Team of the Century chosen in 1984. Paddy Prendergast was also a fixture in Kilkenny's defence in the 1970s and 1980s, winning three All-Ireland medals and three National Hurling League Medals. Harry Ryan played in the Kilkenny forward line in the 1980s, winning an All-Ireland medal in 1983. Lester Ryan is another all-Ireland winner, nephew of his namesake Lester Ryan who played with Kilkenny in the 1980s.  Lester Ryan captained Kilkenny to All-Ireland Success in 2015. Shane Prendergast (son of Paddy Prendergast) was the captain of the Kilkenny Senior Team in 2016.

Clara is the only team in the county to have players chosen on both the hurling and camogie teams of the century: Jim Langton, and Liz Neary who won seven All-Ireland camogie titles with Kilkenny.

Honours
Kilkenny Senior Hurling Championships (3): 1986, 2013, 2015
 Kilkenny Senior Hurling League (1): 2013
All-Ireland Intermediate Club Hurling Championships (1) 2013
Leinster Intermediate Club Hurling Championships (1): 2012
Kilkenny Intermediate Hurling Championships (4): 1981, 1998, 2007, 2012
Kilkenny Junior Hurling Championships (2): 1969, 1977
Kilkenny Minor Hurling Championships (1): 2007
Kilkenny Under-21 Hurling Championships (3) 1967, 1979, 1984
Leinster div.4 club leagues (1): 2010
Leinster div.1 club leagues (1): 2011

Notable players

 Jim Langton
 Liz Neary
 Paddy Prendergast
 Harry Ryan
 Lester Ryan
 Lester Ryan, Jnr.
 Shane Prendergast

See also 
Kilkenny Senior Hurling Championship

References

External links
 Official Clara GAA Club website (archived 2008)
 Information about Clara on the KilkennyCats website (archived 2008)
 Information about Clara on the KilkennyCats website (archived 2008)

Gaelic games clubs in County Kilkenny
Hurling clubs in County Kilkenny